Georges Lagrange (August 31, 1928 in Gagny, Seine-Saint-Denis – April 30, 2004 in Poitiers) was a French Esperantist writer and member of the Academy of Esperanto. He translated several theater pieces from French to Esperanto, acted in some of them, and wrote poems and detective novels under the pseudonym Serĝo Elgo.

Some translations 
 Andromaka, and Fedra, Jean Racine
 Hernani, Victor Hugo, 
 Justuloj, Albert Camus
 Fatomaŝino, Jean Cocteau
 La kalva Kantistino, Eugène Ionesco

References

1928 births
2004 deaths
People from Gagny
French Esperantists
Writers of Esperanto literature
Translators to Esperanto
French crime fiction writers
Writers from Île-de-France
French male stage actors
Volapükologists
French male poets
French male novelists
20th-century French poets
20th-century French novelists
20th-century translators
20th-century French male writers
French male non-fiction writers